Jos De Mey (Sint-Denijs-Westrem, 10 February 1928 – Ghent, 22 December 2007) was a Flemish-Belgian painter. He is primarily known for depictions of impossible objects in a photo-realistic style, with acrylic paintings constituting the majority of his work. He frequently depicted characters of other artists – notably Magritte, M. C. Escher, and Bruegel.

Prior to his focus on painting he taught and studied at the Royal Academy of Fine Arts in Ghent. At the time of his death De Mey resided in Zomergem, Belgium.

External links
 An unofficial online gallery
 planetperplex.com gallery

1928 births
2007 deaths
20th-century Belgian painters